The Sailor's Return is a 1978 British drama film directed by Jack Gold and starring Tom Bell, Shope Shodeinde and Elton Charles. It is based on the 1925 novel The Sailor's Return by David Garnett. It was made by Euston Films. The film concerns the ostracizing of a sailor and his black wife.

The budget of the film was £400,000.

Premise
A sailor returns to his hometown to open a pub bringing with him his new black wife. Very quickly they find themselves ostracised by the community.

Cast
 Tom Bell ...  William Targett
 Shope Shodeinde ...  Princess Tulip
 Elton Charles ...  Billy / Olu Targett
 Denyse Alexander ...  Mrs. Cherret
 Julia Swift ...  Annie
 Pat Keen ...  Mrs. Bascombe
 Nigel Hawthorne ...  Mr. Fosse
 Jill Spurrier ...  Mrs. Frickes
 Ray Smith ...  Fred Leake
 Mick Ford ...  Tom Madgwick
 Peter Benson ...  Charlie Nye
 Ann Way ...  Mrs. Clall
 Paola Dionisotti ...  Lucy Sturmey
 George Costigan ...  Harry Targett
 Clive Swift ...  Reverend Pottock
 Victor Winding ... Ship's Captain

References

External links

1978 films
British historical drama films
1970s historical drama films
Films directed by Jack Gold
Films based on British novels
Films scored by Carl Davis
Films set in England
1978 drama films
1970s English-language films
1970s British films